Spam Bully is anti-spam software made by Axaware, LLC. SpamBully uses Bayesian filtering to separate good emails from spam emails. Spam Bully 3 included a feature which performed automated clicks on spam mail, similar to some other software such as the later AdNauseam browser extension.

References

External links

Spam filtering